Kinta Kellas is partly owned by UEM World Berhad of Malaysia, and mainly manages construction and maintains large-scale projects including roadways, airports, and mixed-use developments. The company operates primarily in Malaysia, Vietnam, and New Zealand. Its shares were previously listed on the London Stock Exchange (KKI). It is historically named after the Scottish plantation owner in British Malaya, William Kellie Smith who is most famous for building Kellie's Castle in Batu Gajah.

Construction and civil engineering companies of Malaysia
Companies formerly listed on the London Stock Exchange